Cargo B Airlines was a cargo airline with its head office in the Brucargo Building 706 in Zaventem, Belgium.

History 
The airline was founded by Rob Kuijpers, former CEO of Brussels Airlines and DHL. It started operations in October 2007. In July 2009 the company announced its move from Brussels Airport to Liège Airport, more flexible with its 24/7 opening hours. The airline ceased operations in July 2009 after failing to receive tenders.

On July 1, 2009, Cargo B went bankrupt and terminated all operation until further notice.

Destinations
Africa

Cairo (Cairo International Airport)

Libreville (Libreville International Airport)

Nairobi (Jomo Kenyatta International Airport)

Tripoli (Tripoli International Airport)

Dakar/Yoff (Léopold Sédar Senghor International Airport)

Johannesburg (OR Tambo International Airport)
Americas

Buenos Aires (Ministro Pistarini International Airport)

Christ Church (Grantley Adams International Airport)

Sao Paulo (Viracopos-Campinas International Airport)

Bogotá (El Dorado International Airport)

Latacunga (Cotopaxi International Airport)

Lima (Jorge Chávez International Airport)

Tobago (Crown Point International Airport)

Caracas (Simón Bolívar International Airport)
Europe

Brussels (Brussels Airport) (hub)

Zaragoza (Zaragoza Airport)

Fleet

Cargo B Airlines operated the following aircraft:

2 Boeing 747-200F (OO-CBA and OO-CBB)
2 Boeing 747-400F (OO-CBC and OO-CBD) These aircraft were dry leased from Nippon Cargo Airlines and were used to replace the older Boeing 747-200F (OO-CBA and OO-CBB).

Boeing 747-200F (OO-CBA) was later written off after a tail strike at Brussels Airport on 27 October 2008.

References

External links

Cargo B

Defunct airlines of Belgium
Airlines established in 2007
Airlines disestablished in 2009
Cargo airlines of Belgium
Belgian companies established in 2007
Zaventem
Companies based in Flemish Brabant